William Pollock may refer to:
 William P. Pollock (1870–1922), United States Senator from South Carolina
 William H. K. Pollock (1859–1896), English chess master
 William Pollock (priest) (1812–1873), Archdeacon of Chester 
 William Pollock (cricketer) (1886–1972), Irish cricketer
 William Pollock (unionist) (1899–1982), American labor union leader
 Sir William Frederick Pollock, 2nd Baronet, British barrister and author

See also
 William Pollack (1926–2013), British-born American immunologist 
 Bill Pollack (1925–2017), American racing driver